Axwijk is a surname. Notable people with the surname include:

Lion Axwijk (born 1984), Dutch footballer, brother of Iwan
Iwan Axwijk (born 1983), Dutch footballer